St Wilfrid's Catholic High School may refer to:

 St Wilfrid's Catholic School, Crawley
 St Wilfrids Catholic High School, North Featherstone